Cyperus fulvoalbescens is a species of sedge that is native to southern parts of Vietnam.

See also 
 List of Cyperus species

References 

fulvoalbescens
Plants described in 1955
Flora of Vietnam